James Love was a former Australian professional soccer player who played as a half-back for Queen's Park, Thistle and the Australia national soccer team.

Club career
Love played for Queens Park before joining Thistle in 1921. He won the Premiership with Thistle in 1923.

International career
Love played his one and only international match with Australia in June 1923 on their second historic tour against New Zealand, playing in a 2–1 win over New Zealand. 
Netflix created The English Game based on Love.

Career statistics

International

References

Australian soccer players
Association football midfielders
Australia international soccer players